Dartmouth High School may refer to:

 Dartmouth High School (Nova Scotia), in Dartmouth, Nova Scotia, Canada
 Dartmouth High School (Sandwell), in England
 Dartmouth High School (Massachusetts), in Dartmouth, Massachusetts, United States